The Fire Fighters is a 1927 American action film serial directed by Jacques Jaccard. The film is considered to be lost.

Plot
In this ten-chapter serial, Jack Dougherty plays a fire fighter who stands up to a villainous crime boss who caused his father's death.

Cast
Jack Dougherty as Jimmie Powers
 Helen Ferguson as Mary Kent
 Wilbur McGaugh
 Lafe McKee
 Al Hart (as Albert Hart)
 Florence Allen
 Robert Irwin
 Milton Brown (as Milt Brown)
 George German

See also
 List of American films of 1927
 List of film serials
 List of film serials by studio

References

External links

1927 films
1920s action films
1927 lost films
American silent serial films
American black-and-white films
American action films
Films directed by Jacques Jaccard
Lost American films
Universal Pictures film serials
Lost action films
1920s American films